The France–Italy border is 515 km (320 mi) long. It runs from the Alps in the north, a region in which it passes over Mont Blanc, down to the Mediterranean coast in the south. Three national parks are located along the border: Vanoise National Park and Mercantour National Park on the French side and Gran Paradiso National Park on the Italian side.

Features 
The France–Italy border is mainly mountainous. It begins at the west tripoint of France–Italy–Switzerland near the top of Mont Dolent ( m), in the French commune of Chamonix (department of Haute-Savoie), the Italian city of Courmayeur (Aosta Valley) and the Swiss commune of Orsières (canton of Valais).

The boundary then follows a general direction towards south, to the Mediterranean, it reaches the sea at Menton in France and Ventimiglia in Italy. The border separates three regions (Aosta Valley, Piedmont and Liguria) and four provinces of Italy (Aosta, Turin, Cuneo and Imperia) from two regions (Auvergne-Rhône-Alpes and Provence-Alpes-Côte d'Azur) and five departments of France (Haute-Savoie, Savoie, Hautes-Alpes, Alpes-de-Haute-Provence and Alpes-Maritimes).

Road crossings 
The points of paved road crossings between the two countries are, from north to south, quoted in this exhaustive list:

 Mont Blanc Tunnel
 Little St Bernard Pass
 The Saint Nicolas plateau below the Mont Cenis pass
 Fréjus Road Tunnel
 Pian del Colle (near Col de l'Échelle)
 Col de Montgenèvre (near Claviere)
 Col Agnel
 Maddalena Pass
 Col de la Lombarde
 Tende Tunnel
 Fanghetto, one of two villages in the municipality of Olivetta San Michele
 Olivetta San Michele
 Menton (France) and Ventimiglia (Italy)

In 1999, there was a large fire in the Mont Blanc Tunnel after a truck crashed into other vehicles. Emergency personnel from both sides of the border tried their best to intervene but 39 people died. The tunnel was closed for nearly three years following the fire.

History 

The border between the two countries dates back to that separating the Kingdom of Sardinia and France during the 19th century. In 1860, the Treaty of Turin links the Savoy and County of Nice to France; the border between the French Empire and the Kingdom of Sardinia was surveyed the following year.

At the conclusion of the Battle of France in World War II, Italy claimed and administered French territory under the terms of the armistice of 24 June 1940 (the Franco-Italian armistice signed at the Incisa villa near Rome) which were extended from 11 November 1942. The Germans occupied the Italian zone from 1943, and the territory was finally liberated by France in 1944. The border was then changed by the Treaty of Paris in 1947, when France acquired Tende, La Brigue, Mont Chaberton and the Lake of Mont Cenis.

In the 21st century, an ongoing issue to be resolved concerns the demarcation of the border at the top of Mont Blanc.

References 

 
International borders
European Union internal borders